Miss America 1987, the 60th Miss America pageant, was held at the Boardwalk Hall in Atlantic City, New Jersey on September 13, 1986 on NBC Network.

Although an entry representing the city of Memphis had been victorious in the pageant of 1947, Kellye Cash became the first woman with the title Miss Tennessee to win the crown. She is a great-niece of the singer Johnny Cash.

Results

Order of announcements

Top 10

Awards

Preliminary awards

Non-finalist awards

Judges
Theodore Bikel
Bernard J Dobroski
Dody Goodman
Sam Haskell
Bernard A Maguire
Liliane Montevecchi
Dee Dee Wood
Shirley Cothran

Contestants

References

External links
 Miss America official website

1987
1986 in the United States
1987 beauty pageants
1986 in New Jersey
September 1986 events in the United States
Events in Atlantic City, New Jersey